TerraSur (previously known as EFE Chillán) is a Chilean Inter-city rail service, opened in 2001 between Santiago and Chillán, on the Chilean Central Valley. It is operated by the Trenes Regionales Terra S.A., a subsidiary of the Empresa de los Ferrocarriles del Estado (EFE). Covering almost 400 km in less than 5 hours, it is the fastest public transportation between those cities.

Currently it is one of the only inter-city services that still operates in the country, (the other intercity rail service is the Alameda-Temuco train, a seasonal train) and is the fastest rail service in South America, with an operational speed reaching 150 km/h.

Since June 2012, TerraSur has two daily services on each direction, between Santiago and Chillán, increasing to three on Mondays.

Planned upgrade
In 2019, EFE announced its intention to launch a tender for the supply of six new rolling stock units capable of maximum speeds of 160 km/h. These new vehicles, along with the automation and upgrade of 74 level crossings will allow a journey time of 2 hours 40 minutes for express services between Santiago and Chillán, with intermediate stops at San Bernardo, Rancagua and Talca, and will allow the service to meet the international definition of Higher-speed rail, making it the first in South America. Along with a standard service consisting of ten intermediate stops, EFE plans to operate 12 daily round trips.

Rolling Stock 

TerraSur uses the Spanish made EMU UTS-444 series RENFE, that hold the driver's cabin and the pantograph, with one RENFE 10000 Series passenger coach in the middle of each convoy.

Accommodations 

The trains consist of 2 types of accommodations; 
Coach Class (standard class) (reserved seating): Car with 74 passenger capacity, sliding seats, arranged in rows (2+2), with a central aisle, facing each other at the centre, in a way that 50% of the seats are arranged to be facing to the rear of the train.
Business Class (first class) (reserved seating): Car with 35 passenger capacity, reclining booths to 140°, arranged in rows (2+1), with an aisle at the centre and facing each other, 50% of the seats are facing the front of the train and the other 50% are facing the rear of the train.

Stations

References

External links 
 Empresa de los Ferrocarriles del Estado
 

Passenger rail transport in Chile